The Ring Nebula in Barnard's Galaxy has the official designation of Hubble 1925 III as it was the third (Roman numeral 3) object recorded in Hubble's 1925 paper, N.G.C. 6822, A Remote Stellar System.  It includes areas of bright H II emission.  In Paul W. Hodge's 1977 paper it was designated Hodge 4.

Its appearance is very similar to the filamentary nebula found in the Large Magellanic Cloud (see Meaburn 1981).  It most resembles the circular ring-like nebula N70 in the LMC.

In 1987 this object Hubble III in NGC 6822, was observed with the Manchester Echelle Spectrometer II.

See also
 Bubble Nebula (NGC 6822)
 NGC 6822

References

External links
 Simbad
 Clayton, C.A.  "The Dynamics of the giant ring nebula Hubble III in NGC 6822", Monthly Notices of the Royal Astronomical Society, vol. 226, May 15, 1987, p. 493-504

H II regions
Sagittarius (constellation)
NGC 6822